Lake Eyre, officially known as Kati Thanda–Lake Eyre, is an endorheic lake in east-central Far North South Australia, some  north of Adelaide. When the lake is full, it has the same salinity level as seawater, but becomes hypersaline as the lake dries up and the water evaporates.

The lake was named in honour of Edward John Eyre, the first European to see it in 1840.  The lake's official name was changed in December 2012 to combine the name "Lake Eyre" with the Aboriginal name, Kati Thanda. The native title over the lake and surrounding region is held by the Arabana people.

Geography

Kati Thanda–Lake Eyre is in the deserts of central Australia, in northern South Australia. The Lake Eyre Basin is a large endorheic system surrounding the lakebed, the lowest part of which is filled with the characteristic salt pan caused by the seasonal expansion and subsequent evaporation of the trapped waters. Even in the dry season, there is usually some water remaining in Kati Thanda–Lake Eyre, normally collecting in over 200 smaller sub-lakes within its margins. The lake was formed by aeolian processes after tectonic upwarping occurred to the south subsequent to the end of the Pleistocene epoch.

During the rainy season, rivers from the north-east part of the Lake Eyre Basin—in outback (south-west and central) Queensland—flow towards the lake through the Channel Country. The amount of water from the monsoon determines whether water will reach the lake and, if it does, how deep the lake will get.

The  altitude usually attributed to Kati Thanda–Lake Eyre refers to the deepest parts of the lake floor, in Belt Bay and the Madigan Gulf. The lake is the area of maximum deposition of sediment in the Lake Eyre Basin.

Lake Eyre is divided into two sections which are joined by the Goyder Channel. The salt crusts are thickest—up to —in the southern Belt Bay, Jackboot Bay and Madigan Gulf sub-basins of Lake Eyre North.

Since 1883, proposals have been made to flood Lake Eyre with seawater brought to the basin via a canal or pipeline. The purpose was, in part, to increase evaporation and thereby increase rainfall in the region downwind of an enlarged Lake Eyre. The added rainfall has been modelled as small. Due to the basin's low elevation below sea level and the region's high annual evaporation rate (between ), such schemes have generally been considered impractical, as it is likely that accumulation of salt deposits would rapidly block the engineered channel. At a rate of  evaporation per day, a  viaduct flowing a  would supply enough water to create a  sea. If brine water were not sent back to the ocean, it would precipitate  of salt every year.

Salinity
The salinity in the lake increases as the  salt crust dissolves over a period of six months of a major flood, resulting in a massive fish kill. The lake takes on a pink hue when saturated, due to the presence of beta-carotene pigment caused by the alga Dunaliella salina.

History 
Wangkangurru (also known as Arabana/Wangkangurru, Wangganguru, Wanggangurru, Wongkangurru) is an Australian Aboriginal language spoken on Wangkangurru country. It is closely related to Arabana language of South Australia. The Wangkangurru language region was traditionally in the South Australian-Queensland border region taking in Birdsville and extending south towards Innamincka and Kati Thanda, including the local government areas of the Shire of Diamantina as well as the Outback Communities Authority of South Australia.

Floods

Typically a  flood occurs every three years, a  flood every decade, and a fill or near fill a few times a century. The water in the lake soon evaporates, with a minor or medium flood drying by the end of the following summer. Most of the water entering the lakes arrives via Warburton River.

In strong La Niña years, the lake can fill. Torrential rain in January 2007 took about six weeks to reach the lake but only placed a small amount of water into it.

When recently flooded, the lake is almost fresh, and native freshwater fish, including bony bream (Nematolosa erebi), the Lake Eyre Basin sub-species of golden perch (Macquaria ambigua) and various small hardyhead species (Craterocephalus spp.) can survive in it.

2009 to 2011

As the flood did not start filling the lake's deepest point (Belt Bay) until late March, little bird life appeared, preferring instead to nest in the upper reaches of the Lake Eyre Basin, north of Birdsville, where large lakes appeared in January as a result of monsoonal rain.

The high rainfall in summer 2010 sent flood water into the Diamantina, Georgina and Cooper Creek catchments of the Lake Eyre basin, with the Cooper Creek reaching the lake for the first time since 1990. The higher rainfall prompted many different birds to migrate back to the area for breeding.

Heavy local rain in early March 2011 in the Stuart Creek and Warriner catchments filled Lake Eyre South, with Lake Eyre North about 75 per cent covered with water firstly from the Neales and Macumba Rivers, and later from the Warburton River.

2015 to 2016 
In late 2015, water began flowing into Lake Eyre following heavy rain in the north-east of the state.

2019

In late March 2019, floodwaters began arriving as a result of torrential rains in northern Queensland in January. In the past, the water had taken anywhere from three to 10 months to reach the lake, but this time it arrived in two. The first flooding would be closely followed by another surge, following rains produced by Cyclone Trevor. Traditional owners and graziers agree that it is essential that the river run its course and should not be harvested during floods, as any interference in the natural systems could damage the ecosystem.

Yacht club
The Lake Eyre Yacht Club is a dedicated group of sailors who sail on the lake's floods, including recent trips in 1997, 2000, 2001, 2004, 2007 and 2009. A number of  trailer sailers sailed on Kati Thanda–Lake Eyre in 1975, 1976, and 1984, when the flood depth reached . In July 2010 The Yacht Club held its first regatta since 1976 and its first on Lake Killamperpunna, a freshwater lake on Cooper Creek. The Cooper had reached Kati Thanda–Lake Eyre for the first time since 1990. It is estimated that these waters reach Lake Eyre roughly 8 years in 100.

When the lake is full, a notable phenomenon is that around midday the surface can often become very flat. The surface then reflects the sky in a way that leaves both the horizon and water surface virtually impossible to see. The commodore of the Lake Eyre Yacht Club has stated that sailing during this time has the appearance of sailing in the sky.

Land speed record attempts

Kati Thanda–Lake Eyre has been a site for various land speed record attempts on its salt flats, similar to those found in the Bonneville Salt Flats, especially those by Donald Campbell with the Bluebird-Proteus CN7.

Biota
Phytoplankton in the lake includes Nodularia spumigena and a number of species of Dunaliella.

Birds
Birds such as pelicans and banded stilts are drawn to a filled lake from southern coastal regions of Australia, and from as far afield as Papua New Guinea. During the 1989–1990 flood, it was estimated that 200,000 pelicans, 80% of Australia's total population, came to feed & roost at Lake Eyre. Scientists are presently unable to determine how such birds appear able to detect the filling of the lake, even when hundreds or thousands of kilometres away from the basin.

Protected area status

Statutory
The extent of the lake is covered by two protected areas declared by the Government of South Australia - the Kati Thanda-Lake Eyre National Park and the Elliot Price Conservation Park.

Non-statutory

Wetlands
Lake Eyre is on the list of wetlands of national importance known as A Directory of Important Wetlands in Australia.

Important bird area
Lake Eyre has been identified by BirdLife International as an Important Bird Area (IBA) known as the Lake Eyre Important Bird Area, because, when flooded, it supports major breeding events of the banded stilt and Australian pelican, as well as over 1% of the world populations of red-necked avocets, sharp-tailed sandpipers, red-necked stints, silver gulls and Caspian terns.

See also

 Lake Torrens
 List of lakes of Australia
 Pluvial lake

References

Further reading

 
Dr Vincent Kotwicki: Floods of Lake Eyre - interesting site with much data, including Lake Eyre inflows 1885–2012.
Salt - documentary film by Murray Fredericks and Michael Angus (synopsis)
NASA Earth Observatory: Lake Eyre Filling Peaks - 21 June 2009
Lake Eyre Yacht Club website

External links 
 Multimedia & Aerial View of the Lake Eyre

Ancient lakes
Eyre, Lake
Eyre, Lake
Lake Eyre basin
Far North (South Australia)
Extreme points of Australia
Lowest points